The Seoul Spring (Korean:서울의 봄) was a period of democratization in South Korea from 26 October 1979 to 17 May 1980. This expression was derived from the Prague Spring of Czechoslovakia in 1968.

The assassination of president Park Chung-hee on 26 October 1979 by Kim Jae-gyu, terminating his dictatorship, was expected to democratize South Korea soon by people who revived democratization movements.

The National Conference for Unification tried to nominate Choi Kyu-hah to succeed Park Chung-hee as president through the indirect election. Then, some anti-government figures held a fake wedding ceremony - in order to gather people, getting around the law prohibiting any political meeting - to denounce the martial law army and the National Conference for Unification after which the martial law army arrested 140 participants, including 14 persons delivered to the defence security command in Yongsan-gu and tortured. After the large-scale demonstration in Seoul Station, general Chun Doo-hwan, holding de facto real power at that time, declared the emergency martial to escalate and the army assaulted Ewha Womans University to arrest students representatives who had gathered there. The Seoul Spring effectively came to a close with the Gwangju Massacre on 18 May 1980, which spurred future social movements toward democratization in the country.

See also
Prague Spring

References

Protests in South Korea
South Korean democracy movements
1970s in Seoul
1979 in South Korea
1980 in South Korea
Choi Kyu-hah
Chun Doo-hwan
Roh Tae-woo
Gwangju Uprising
1980s in Seoul